Starý Tekov (also Altbarsch, Altbersenberg, (Alt-)Bersenburg, in earlier times also Berschenberg, Alt Berschenburg) is a village and municipality in the Levice District in the Nitra Region of Slovakia.

History
In historical records the village was first mentioned in 1075.

Geography
It has a population of about 1470 people.

Ethnicity
The village is approximately 87% Slovak and 13% Magyar.

Facilities
The village has a public library a gym and football pitch.

External links
 Official website

Villages and municipalities in Levice District